Electroboy is a 2014 Swiss documentary film directed by Marcel Gisler about the life of Florian Burkhardt, alias Electroboy, model, snowboard pioneer, advertiser, author, party organizer and composer during the 1990s, who now suffers from a generalized anxiety.

Production
The documentary was shot in Switzerland, Germany, India and the United States between April and July 2013. It premiered at Locarno International Film Festival. It was released in Swiss cinemas in November 2014 and in German and Austrian cinemas in November 2015.

Reception
The Hollywood Reporter researcher Boyd van Hoeij says about the film: "A fascinating look at a complex human being’s many up and downs" and "Instead of becoming a long list of occurrences, accomplishments, reinventions and psychological challenges and transformations, the film naturally brings all these elements together to paint a picture of an extremely complex human being [...] who had to try and find out the hard way who he was and what he wanted out of life."
Madeleine Hirsiger from Locarno International Film Festival says about the film: "...excellently and densely edited portrait leads the spectator into an anxiety from which there is no escape."

Awards

 Swiss Film Award 2015: Best Documentary and Best Editing
 Zurich Film Prize 2014 
 International Documentary Film Festival Munich 2015: Audience Award 
 Nomination for the Swiss Film Award 2015: Best Score
 Selection for the European Film Award 2015: Best Documentary

References

External links
 
 

2014 films
2014 documentary films
Swiss documentary films
2010s English-language films
2010s German-language films
Swiss German-language films
2014 multilingual films
Swiss multilingual films